, stylised as RADWIMPS 2 ~Hatten Tojō~, is Japanese rock band RADWIMPS' second album under independent label Newtraxx, released on March 8, 2005.

Background and development 

The album was the first to feature the band's current line-up, after their reformation in 2004. The band first recorded and released the single "Kiseki" in 2004. Two months after the album's release, the band released their final independent release, the double A-side "Hexun/Kanashi."

The album was created by recording song after song, until the band had enough material for an album. This technique was regretted by the band members, as it made album recording feel like work. The album was recorded with each member recording their instruments separately, a technique they no longer used in their next album. Immediately after the release of the album, vocalist and songwriter Yojiro Noda regretted the album's release, and wanted to make a new record as quickly as possible afterwards.

Commercial reception 

The album did not chart on Oricon's top 300 albums chart until May 2006. The album was a very gradual seller, charting for 106 weeks, and peaking at number 80. The album reached this peak in early 2007, and has only spent a single week in the top 100. Despite charting longer than the band's debut album and selling more units of it, it has not been officially recognised by the RIAJ as a gold certified album.

Track listing

Chart rankings

Sales

Release history

References

2005 albums
Radwimps albums